Booklet may refer to:

 A small book or group of pages
 A pamphlet
 A type of tablet computer
 Postage stamp booklet, made up of one or more small panes of postage stamps in a cardboard cover
 Liner notes, writings found in booklets which come inserted into the compact disc or DVD jewel case or the equivalent packaging for vinyl records and cassettes
 Digital booklet, the digital equivalent of liner notes that often accompany digital music purchases
 Nokia Booklet 3G, a netbook computer
 Programme (booklet), available for patrons attending live events

See also 
 Book (disambiguation)